Dan Turner (born 9 February 1980) (also known as Otaihanga Dan, Diesel Turbo, Dulcet Tones, DT or the Detonator) is a New Zealand born Scotland A international rugby union player who played for Glasgow Warriors at the Lock position.

He played for Canterbury University in New Zealand and was part of the Canterbury Crusaders development squad.

He signed for Glasgow Warriors in 2004. He qualified for Scotland through residency and confirmed his Scottish nationality by receiving a Scotland A cap in 2008. He gained seven caps for Scotland A.

Turner moved from Glasgow to Japan in 2010. He played a year in Japan, turning out for Toyota Shokki, before moving back to New Zealand.

He is now a civil engineer for Land Matters Limited.

Since retiring from professional rugby Dan has kept fit by taking part in endurance sport, most recently winning the Tararua Mountain Race Veteran Pair category in 2020 with team mate Sam Pritchard.

References

External links
Dan Turner - Marist St. Pats profile

1980 births
Living people
Glasgow Warriors players
Scottish rugby union players
Melrose RFC players
Scotland 'A' international rugby union players
Rugby union locks